The Minister of State at the Department of Health is a junior ministerial post in the Department of Health of the Government of Ireland who may perform functions delegated by the Minister for Health. A Minister of State does not hold cabinet rank.

There are currently three Ministers of State, who were appointed in 2022:
Hildegarde Naughton, TD – Minister of State with responsibility for Public Health, Well Being, National Drugs Strategy;
Mary Butler, TD – Minister of State with responsibility for Mental Health and Older People; and
Anne Rabbitte, TD – Minister of State with responsibility for Disability. Rabbitte is also Minister of State at the Department of Children, Equality, Disability, Integration and Youth, where she also has responsibility for Disability.

List of Parliamentary Secretaries

List of Ministers of State

References

Health
Department of Health (Ireland)